Rafa is a masculine given name, mostly as a diminutive form (hypocorism) of Rafael. It may refer to:

People 
 Rafael Nadal (born 1986), Spanish tennis player
 Rafa (footballer, born 1985), Spanish footballer Rafael López Gómez
 Rafael Benítez (born 1960), Spanish football manager and former player
 Rafa Cabrera-Bello (born 1984), Spanish golfer
 Rafa Gálvez (born 1993), Spanish footballer
 Rafa Gil (born 1975), Spanish football manager
 Rafa Gómez (born 1983), Spanish footballer
 Rafa (footballer, born 1970), Spanish retired football goalkeeper
 Rafa Jordà (born 1984), Spanish footballer
 Rafa Luz (born 1992), Spanish basketball player
 Rafael Márquez (born 1979), Mexican footballer
 Rafa Martínez (born 1982), Spanish basketball player
 Rafa Mir (born 1997), Spanish footballer
 Rafa Navarro (footballer, born 1994), Spanish footballer
 Rafael Páez (born 1994), Spanish footballer
 Rafa Pérez (born 1990), Colombian footballer
 Rafael Ponzo (born 1978), Venezuelan football goalkeeper
 Rafa Silva (born 1993), Portuguese footballer
 Rafa Soares (born 1995), Portuguese footballer
 Rafa Villar (born 1968), Spanish writer and poet

Fictional characters
 Rafa, in the TV series Royal Pains

Spanish-language hypocorisms
Portuguese masculine given names